Bennion Lloyd Spencer (born October 26, 1952) is a journalist and professor, and was the 2008 Democratic candidate for Utah's 3rd congressional district running against Republican Jason Chaffetz.

Biographical background
A native of Layton, Utah, Spencer served a two-year mission for the LDS Church in England and Wales.  In 1976, he received a Bachelor's degree in Broadcast Communications from Weber State College.  After five years as a reporter, he completed a Master of Science in International Relations from Utah State University in 1985.

Spencer spent 25 years as a journalist in both Texas and Utah.  In Salt Lake City, he was a television news reporter at KTVX, from 1980-1985.  He then became news producer at KSL-TV from 1985-1996.  Moving to Beaumont, Texas, he was TV news director at KBMT from 1996-1998.

Spencer now resides in Riverton, Utah.

Spencer has also been an instructor at Salt Lake Community College, Utah Valley University and Neumont University.  While at Salt Lake Community College, he developed a broadcast journalism program for Spanish-speaking students.  Spencer was also faculty advisor for Operation Smile at Utah Valley State College.

In 2007, he helped Dick Nourse, former KSL anchor and colleague, establish the Dick Nourse Center for Mass Communications and Journalism at Dixie State College in St. George, Utah.

Campaigns
Spencer ran for Utah State Senate District 5 in 2000, and again in 2002 for District 11, losing both races.

2008 congressional race
In May 2008, Spencer was nominated by Dick Nourse and unopposed as the Democratic candidate for Utah's 3rd Congressional District.  Spencer was considered a long shot against Jason Chaffetz in the heavily Republican 3rd district.

In August 2008, he received international press for commenting to The Salt Lake Tribune about how Jesus would vote. Spencer indicated positively when asked if he thought that he would win Jesus' vote, a statement he later retracted under pressure from conservative media.

Bennion lost with 28 percent of the vote to Chaffetz's 66 percent.

Notes

Sources

External links
2008 Congressional campaign site

1952 births
20th-century Mormon missionaries
Latter Day Saints from Utah
American Mormon missionaries in England
American Mormon missionaries in the United Kingdom
Utah Tech University people
Living people
Mormon missionaries in Wales
People from Layton, Utah
People from Riverton, Utah
Utah Democrats
Utah State University alumni
Utah Valley University faculty
Weber State University alumni